Mallonia is a genus of longhorn beetles of the subfamily Lamiinae, containing the following species:

 Mallonia albosignata Chevrolat, 1858
 Mallonia australis Péringuey, 1888
 Mallonia barbicornis (Fabricius, 1798)
 Mallonia granulata Distant, 1892
 Mallonia orientalis Breuning, 1938
 Mallonia patricii Breuning, 1938
 Mallonia pauper Jordan, 1903

References

Pachystolini